The year 1765 in architecture involved some significant architectural events and new buildings.

Buildings and structures

Buildings completed
 May – Bernstorff Palace, Copenhagen, Denmark, is completed.
 Kedleston Hall in Derbyshire, England, designed by Robert Adam.
 Château d'Arcelot on the Côte-d'Or of France is completed.
 Remodelling of the Summer Archbishop's Palace in Bratislava by F. A. Hillebrandt is completed.

Births
 July 20 – Peter Nicholson, Scottish architect, engineer and mathematician (died 1844)

Deaths
 October 21 – Giovanni Paolo Pannini, Italian painter and architect (born 1691)

References

Architecture
Years in architecture
18th-century architecture